The Office is a mockumentary sitcom created by Ricky Gervais and Stephen Merchant, first made in the United Kingdom, then Germany, and subsequently the United States. It has since been remade in ten other countries.

The original series of The Office also starred Gervais as the boss and main character of the show. The two seasons were broadcast on BBC Two in 2001 and 2002, totalling 12 episodes, with two special episodes in 2003, and an extra short spectacular ten years later. A German version titled Stromberg ran for 46 episodes over five seasons, starting in 2004, and the follow-up film Stromberg – Der Film was released in German cinemas in 2014.

The longest-running version of the series, the US adaptation, ran for nine seasons on the NBC Television Network from 2005 to 2013 for a total of 201 episodes. The total overall viewership is in the hundreds of millions worldwide. According to Nielsen Ratings as of April 2019, the US version of The Office was the No. 1 streamed show on Netflix in the United States. Extended episodes of the American adaptation have been added to the streaming platform Peacock, in addition to bloopers and extras. The US version features a multitude of catch-phrases, notably, "That's what she said!".

International versions

Counterparts

 Note that the set-up of the German version is more distinct from the original than it is with most of the other versions. The characters given are rough counterparts in terms of their role in the series. They generally have different job descriptions and, in a few cases, may not even work for the company at all. This is mostly due to the fact that, unlike the other derivatives, Stromberg was not an official adaptation of the original series but was merely inspired by it.
 A Russian language version for Channel One Russia with an initial run of 24 episodes was announced in 2008, but was never produced.

Notes

Awards and honors
Selected major awards won only
UK version: 2005 Golden Globes for Best Television Series – Musical or Comedy and Best Performance by an Actor in a Television Series – Musical or Comedy (Ricky Gervais); 2001, 2002 and 2003 British Academy Television Awards for Situation Comedy and Best Comedy Performance (Ricky Gervais)
US version: 2006 Golden Globe for Best Performance by an Actor in a Television Series – Musical or Comedy (Steve Carell); 2006 Emmy Award for Outstanding Comedy Series; 2007 Screen Actors Guild Award for Outstanding Performance by an Ensemble in a Comedy Series; 2007 Emmy Award for Outstanding Writing for a Comedy Series (Greg Daniels); 2009 Primetime Emmy Award for Outstanding Directing for a Comedy Series (Jeffrey Blitz). For other awards and honors see List of awards and nominations received by The Office (American TV series)
German version: 2006 Grimme Award for Fiction/Entertainment – Series/Miniseries; 2007 Deutscher Fernsehpreis for Best Sitcom and Best Book; 2006, 2007, 2010 and 2012 Deutscher Comedypreis for Best Actor in a Comedy Series (Christoph Maria Herbst).

References

External links

A comparison of the US, UK, French, and German shows on Slate
The Office on Comedy Central
The Office: A decade around the world
The Official Office Merchandise

 
Television franchises
Lists of British television series characters
Lists of sitcom television characters
Workplace comedy television series